311 Squadron or 311th Squadron may refer to:

 No. 311 Squadron RAF,  a Czechoslovak-manned bomber squadron of the Royal Air Force in World War II
 No. 311 Squadron RNLAF, a disbanded Royal Netherlands Air Force unit
 311th Aero Squadron, a United States Army Air Force unit
 311th Airlift Squadron, a United States Air Force unit
 311th Fighter Squadron, a United States Air Force unit
 INAS 311, an Indian naval air squadron
 VMA-311, a United States Marine Corps attack squadron

See also
 311th Wing